SS Maritime Victory, hull number 821, VC2-S-AP2/WSAT, renamed USAT Pvt. Frederick C. Murphy, was an American Army troop transport which saw duty just after World War II.

The Maritime Victory was unusual in that as an AP2 vessel, the cargo holds were converted for troop berthing (though with reduced cargo-carrying ability) and topside cargo handling gear was retained.  A total of 97 such VC2-S-AP2 conversions were planned, 84 completed.

On 5 July 1946 the ship was returned to the U.S. Army.  On 30 August 1946 it was put into the reserve fleet and renamed USAT Pvt. Frederick C. Murphy on 10 February 1950 in honor of World War II Medal of Honor recipient Frederick C. Murphy.

As one of the last surviving ships of her kind she received extensive documentation by the National Park Service in 2006, which produced the archival record Private Frederick C. Murphy HAER Report.

History

Construction and operation 

She was launched at the Bethlehem-Fairfield Shipyards on Tuesday, 22 May 1945, sponsored by J. Buell Snyder, wife of Congressman Snyder. Delivered on 18 June 1945, she was transferred to the Army War Department as an Army Transport. She was operated under contract by the American South African Line.

In Army service 

The Maritime Victory was delivered to the USAT as a transport in June 1945.  The ship made several crossings carrying troops from the European Theater of Operations, especially between Le Havre and New York.  From Le Havre she often left from the area known as the Cigarette Camps as part of Operation Magic Carpet to take US troops home.

The ship, having been launched only days after V-E Day was primarily designed to transport troops both to and from Europe.  While the main use of the ship was to transport troops, the ship was also used for humanitarian efforts in the immediate post-war time period.  The ship made several crossings of the Atlantic.  Many of the ships used to transport troops to Europe in the early days of the war were lost or functionally worn out.  The Victory ship was newer and faster than the Liberty ships.  When it was time to bring troops home the net transfer was mostly in moving troops from Europe to America instead of the other way around.

Some transportation of food and supplies were made in a role as a cargo ship to provide relief to the war torn countries of Europe, especially Germany.

Ready Reserve Fleet and scrapping 

The ship was preserved in mothball status at the Beaumont Reserve Fleet in Beaumont, Texas.  It was laid up in 1950. From 1983 to about 1990 the Fredrick C. Murphy was used as the fleet utility ship at Beaumont Reserve. In this role some offices were maintained aboard the ship.

The National Park Service's Historic American Engineering Record (HAER) visited the Private Frederick C. Murphy in 2006 to document the ship.

, the ship has been removed from inventory of Beaumont Reserve.  It is now located at Esco in Brownsville, Texas and awaits scrapping.  Scrapping may be complete as soon as September 2006.

Known sailings

See also 

 SS American Victory, a similar VC2-S-AP2 vessel preserved as a museum ship
 List of Victory ships
 Liberty ship
 Type C1 ship
 Type C2 ship
 Type C3 ship

References

External links 

 Photos of Maritime Victory / Pvt. Frederick C Murphy
 Department of Transportation Maritime Administration
 The Cigarette Camps
 

1945 ships
World War II merchant ships of the United States
Victory ships
Troop ships of the United States
Historic American Engineering Record in Texas